The 1999–2000 CERH European League was the 36th edition of the CERH European League organized by CERH. Its Final Four was held on 29 and 30 April 2000 in Porto, Portugal.

Preliminary round

|}

First round

|}

Group stage
In each group, teams played against each other home-and-away in a home-and-away round-robin format.

The two first qualified teams advanced to the Final Four.

Group A

Group B

Final four
The Final Four was played in the Pavilhão Rosa Mota, Porto, Portugal.

Barcelona achieved their 13th title.

Bracket

References

External links
 CERH website

2000 in roller hockey
1999 in roller hockey
Rink Hockey Euroleague